The Daimler L11 was a German single-seat, parasol-wing, monoplane fighter built during the First World War for the Imperial German Air Service. A single prototype was built in 1918, but the war ended before it could be accepted for service. The two-seat Daimler L14 was based on this aircraft.

Description
Hans Klemm's first design for Daimler, the L11 was an exceptionally clean streamlined parasol monoplane that was powered by the company's water-cooled,  D.IIIb V-8 engine with a two-bladed propeller. A single-seat aircraft, the prototype was unarmed. The sole prototype first flew on 1 October 1918, and continued testing through to February of the following year. The aircraft was initially delivered with unbalanced ailerons, but it was fitted with swivelling wingtips that acted as servo tabs and balanced the ailerons in 1919. Had the war lasted long enough for the Air Service's Inspectorate of Flying Troops to accept the design, the L11 would have been designated as the Daimler D.III.

Specifications (L11)

References

Bibliography

 

1910s German fighter aircraft
L11
Single-engined tractor aircraft
Parasol-wing aircraft
Aircraft first flown in 1918